St Mary Bothaw (or Saint Mary Boatehaw by the Erber) was a parish church in the Walbrook ward of the City of London.  It was destroyed in the Great Fire of London in 1666 and not rebuilt, although some of its materials were used in the rebuilding of St Swithin, London Stone, whose parish it was merged with.

Location
The church stood in the Walbrook ward, in a narrow lane just to the south of Candlewick Street (now Cannon Street).

History
St Mary Bothaw was described by Stow as a "proper church". The dedication is generally derived from "boat-haw", meaning "boat house". The church was in existence by 1279, when William de Hamkynton is recorded as becoming rector following the death of Adam Lambyn. It was one of the 13 "peculiars" within the City under the patronage of the dean and chapter of Canterbury Cathedral.

Robert Chichele, Lord Mayor of London, in 1422, was buried in the church.

According to some sources, St Mary's also contained the tomb of Henry Fitz-Ailwin de Londonestone, the first Lord Mayor of London, and his coat-of-arms was in a stained-glass window there. John Stow, however, said that he was buried at the priory of the Holy Trinity in Aldgate.

Destruction
Along with the majority of parish churches in the city, St Mary Bothaw was destroyed by the Great Fire of London in 1666. A Rebuilding Act was passed in 1670 and a committee set up under Sir Christopher Wren to decide which would be rebuilt; St Mary Bothaw was not amongst them. Instead the parish was united to that of St Swithin, London Stone, and some of the materials from St Mary's were used to rebuild that church. The site was retained as a churchyard until the Cannon Street Railway Station was built over it in the nineteenth century.

References

Sources

10th-century church buildings in England
1666 disestablishments in England
Churches destroyed in the Great Fire of London and not rebuilt
Churches in the City of London
Former buildings and structures in the City of London